National Baptist Convention may refer to:

National Baptist Convention, USA, Inc., the oldest and largest denomination using this name
National Baptist Convention of America, Inc., formed in 1915 as a result of a split within the association now called National Baptist Convention, USA, Inc.
Progressive National Baptist Convention, formed in 1961 as a result of a split within the National Baptist Convention, USA, Inc.
National Missionary Baptist Convention of America, formed in 1988 as a result of a split within the National Baptist Convention of America, Inc. 
Joint National Baptist Convention, an event held periodically in which the conventions meet
National Baptist Convention, Brazil

See also
List of Baptist denominations
 NBC (disambiguation)